The Cheetah Preservation Foundation is a conservation organisation set up in South Africa in 1993 with special dedication to the protection of the vulnerable South African cheetah. It is one of the largest wildlife organisations in Africa. The foundation has set up a number of programmes throughout South Africa such as the Cango Wildlife Ranch near the town of Oudtshoorn.

See also

 Cheetah
 Asiatic cheetah
 Cheetah Conservation Fund
 African Wildlife Foundation

External links
Cheetah Preservation Foundation official website
 US Fish & Wildlife Service. Threatened and Endangered Species System (TESS)
A Volunteer's Story
SSP Fact Sheet on the AZA website.
Cheeta Conservation Fund

References 

 

1993 establishments in South Africa
Conservation projects
Nature conservation in Namibia
Nature conservation in South Africa
Cat conservation organizations
Organizations established in 1993
Animal welfare organisations based in South Africa